IIN and variants may mean:

 International Institute for Nanotechnology at Northwestern University
 II-n or IIn, a subtype of Type II supernova
 Issuer Identification Number, a field in the ISO/IEC 7812 specification for ID cards
 IIN, ICAO airline code for Inter Islands Airlines
 IIN, IATA airport code for Nishinoomote Airport or Tanagashima Airport in the Ōsumi Islands
 Nieuport II.N, an airplane model
 iin, former stock ticker symbol for Australian ISP iiNet, now part of TPG Telecom